Shanghai Singapore International School is a K-12 private, international school founded in 1996 in Shanghai, China.

There are two campuses: the Minhang Campus serves preschool through senior high school and the Xuhui Campus serves preschool through elementary school.

Academics
Academics are based on the Singapore Primary Curriculum leading to the iPSLE, and the IGCSE, IB Diploma Programme, and the IBCC, the school transit from MYP to IGCSE Programme by 2012. The last MYP class ended in academic year 2012/2013.

The school has a reputation among the expatriate parents as a place where children of little or no English Language ability could achieve proficiency within 8 years. The Intensive English Programme of the school remains one of its strongest selling points since no other language including Chinese is allowed to be spoken within. This IEP (Intensive English Programme) is only given in primary years.

The major academic subjects (English, Maths, Science, etc.) are taught in English. Some of the Aesthetics subjects in primary school (Music, Art, etc.) are taught in Chinese.

The academic year normally begins in late August, and ends in mid June. Classes for primary and secondary schools typically have around 22 students per class. There are around 5 classes for each grade. Classes for Pre-school and kindergarten can range from 12 to 18 children depending on which grade.

See also
List of international schools in Shanghai
List of international schools

References

External links

Shanghai Singapore International School - Official homepage
Shanghai Singapore International School - Senior School Online Newsletter
Shanghai Singapore International School - Junior School Online Newsletter
Official listing on Chalksmart education guide

Educational institutions established in 1996
International schools in Shanghai
International Baccalaureate schools in China
Xuhui District
Singaporean international schools in China
Private schools in Shanghai
1996 establishments in China